A Tribute to the Creatures of the Night is a tribute album by various artists to the band Kiss. Artists appearing on the album include Skid Row, Anthrax, The Melvins and Helloween. All tracks are taken from previous released albums and EPs by the bands involved with this tribute, except tracks 10 and 14. The album was released as a CD in Germany by the label Nuclear Blast in 2003 and also in 2006.

Track listing

External links
 [ Album bio], allmusic.com

2003 compilation albums
Kiss (band) tribute albums